The Coelopidae or kelp flies are a family of Acalyptratae flies (order Diptera), they are sometimes also called seaweed flies, though both terms are used for a number of seashore Diptera. Fewer than 40 species occur worldwide. The family is found in temperate areas, with species occurring in the southern Afrotropical, Holarctic, and Australasian (which has the most species) regions.

Family characteristics

Coelopids are small to medium-sized (usually ), robust flies, predominantly with a flat body and darkly coloured. Coelopidae species are usually densely bristly or hairy. Their eyes are small. The arista is bare to pubescent. Ocelli and ocellar bristles are present. The postvertical bristles are parallel or converge. The two pairs of frontal bristles curve outward and scattered interfrontal setulae are present. Vibrissae are absent, but strong bristles occur near the vibrissal angle. The mesonotum is flat and the prothorax is separated from the propleuron by a membrane. The legs bear strong bristles and soft, dense hairs and the tibiae have subapical bristles. The wing is unmarked. The costa is entire, without interruptions. The subcosta is complete, crossvein BM-Cu is present, and the anal cell (cell cup) is closed. Legs usually densely hairy.

Biology
Coelopids are found in the wrack zone of temperate seashores where the larvae feed on rotting seaweed. They are sometimes very abundant in this habitat. They go through several generations a year. The females lay their eggs in small batches into fresh alga banks. Three larval instars occur. Larvae feed in a bacteria-laden mass. Pupation is seldom in the algal substrate that soon collapses, but more frequently in the highest sand layers. Larvae are also found in winter wrack heaps as bacteria raise temperatures to 20-30 °C even if the heap is superficially frozen. Larvae and pupae have numerous predators, including birds and the staphylinid Aleochara and suites of parasites confined to algal banks.

Classification
, following Mathis and McAlpine's taxonomy, Coelopidae consists of two subfamilies: Coelopinae, with three tribes, twelve genera, and twenty-eight species, and Lopinae, consisting of just one monospecific genus.
Subfamily Coelopinae Hendel, 1910
Tribe Coelopini Hendel, 1910
Genus Coelopa Meigen, 1830
Subgenus Coelopa Meigen, 1830
Subgenus Fucomyia Haliday, 1837
Subgenus Neocoelopa Malloch, 1933
Tribe Coelopellini McAlpine, 1991
Genus Amma McAlpine, 1991
Genus Beaopterus Lamb, 1909
Genus Coelopella Malloch, 1933
Genus Icaridion Lamb, 1909 Halteres absent and the wings are reduced to strips. New Zealand.
Genus Rhis McAlpine, 1991
Genus This McAlpine, 1991
Tribe Glumini McAlpine, 1991
Genus Chaetocoelopa Malloch, 1933
Genus Coelopina Malloch, 1933
Genus Dasycoelopa Malloch, 1933
Genus Gluma McAlpine, 1991
Genus Malacomyia Haliday in Westwood, 1840 (sometimes placed in Dryomyzidae)
Subfamily Lopinae McAlpine, 1991
Genus Lopa McAlpine, 1991

Other
Coelopa frigida (Fabricius) has been reared in the laboratory and used for genetic studies.

See also
 Chaetocoelopa littoralis

References

Further reading

External links

 Tree of Life Coelopidae
 Family Coelopidae at EOL
 Diptera.info Images
 BugGuide images
 
 Image of pupa

Identification
 Hennig. 1937. Coelopidae.In: Lindner, E. (Ed.). Die Fliegen der Paläarktischen Region 5, 52, 1-38.Keys to Palaearctic species but now needs revision (in German).
Malloch, J.R. 1933. The genus Coelopa Meigen (Diptera, Coelopidae). Ann. Mag. Nat. Hist. (10) 11: 339-50.
McAlpine, David K. (1991). "Review of the Australian Kelp Flies (Diptera: Coelopidae)" (Print). Systematic Entomology 16: 29-84.
Séguy, E. (1934) Diptères: Brachycères. II. Muscidae acalypterae, Scatophagidae. Paris: Éditions Faune de France 28. virtuelle numérique
Shtakel'berg, A.A. Family Coelopidae in Bei-Bienko, G. Ya, 1988 Keys to the insects of the European Part of the USSR Volume 5 (Diptera) Part 2 English edition.Keys to Palaearctic species but now needs revision .

Species lists
West Palaearctic and Russia
Nearctic
 Australasian/Oceanian
 Japan

 
Brachycera families